The Aby Warburg Prize (German Aby Warburg-Preis; formerly Aby M. Warburg-Preis) is a science prize of the city of Hamburg. It was established in 1979. Since 1980, it is donated by the senate of the city for excellence in the humanities and social sciences. It is named after the Hamburg-born art historian Aby Warburg. The prize is worth 25,000 Euros and awarded every four years. Young scientists will receive a scholarship of 10,000 euros.

Award winners 
 1980 Jan Białostocki, art historian
 1984 Meyer Schapiro, art historian
 1988 Michael Baxandall, art historian
 1992 Carlo Ginzburg, historian  
 1996 Claude Lévi-Strauss, anthropologist and ethnologist
 2000 Natalie Zemon Davis, historian
 2002 Rüdiger Campe, professor of German literature
 2004 Horst Bredekamp, art historian
 2008 Werner Hofmann, art historian
 2012 Martin Warnke, art historian
 2016 Sigrid Weigel, professor of German literature
 2020 Georges Didi-Huberman, art historian

See also
 List of social sciences awards

References

External links
 
 Kulturpreise: Aby Warburg-Preis

Social sciences awards
Awards established in 1979
1979 establishments in Germany
Humanities awards
German awards
Hamburg